Johan de Wit (born 1944) is a contemporary expatriate Dutch poet. He is the author of as many as twenty publications. His first collection, Rose Poems, was published by Actual Size in 1986. Up To You Munro by Veer Books appeared in 2008. Reality Street published his Gero Nimo in 2011. Kenya (Veer) was published in 2016 (with Antony John and Wayne Clements).

He has been described as one of the most innovative poets writing in English in the past twenty years.

Further reading

 Johan de Wit, No Hand Signals.
 Johan de Wit, Gero Nimo.

External links

 Johan de Wit, Onedit issue 14.
 Johan de Wit, Intercapillary Space.

1944 births
Living people
De Wit, Johan
De Wit, Johan
Dutch male poets
Dutch expatriates in the United Kingdom
Place of birth missing (living people)